The National Hockey League (NHL), a professional ice hockey league active in the United States and Canada, is broadcast over the radio mainly in its participating countries.

History

Canada
Hockey Night in Canada has its origins in the General Motors Hockey Broadcast which transmitted Saturday night hockey games of the Toronto Maple Leafs beginning in November 1931 over the Canadian National Railway radio network. In 1933, the CNR's successor, the Canadian Radio Broadcasting Commission, commenced broadcasts of Montreal Canadiens and Montreal Maroons games on its Quebec stations. In 1934, Imperial Oil of Canada took over the sponsorship from General Motors Products of Canada and the broadcast became known as the Imperial Esso Hockey Broadcast. Transmission began at 9 p.m. Eastern Time (the beginning of the second period of play). Starting in 1936, the games were broadcast on CRBC's successor, the Canadian Broadcasting Corporation (with the series acquiring its present title around the same time). In much of Ontario and points west the show featured the Maple Leafs and were hosted by Gordon Calder with play-by-play announcer Foster Hewitt and colour man was Percy Lesueur.  Montreal broadcasts were hosted by Doug Smith and Elmer Ferguson broadcast for Montreal Maroons games in English and René Lecavalier broadcast Montreal Canadiens games in French. After the Maroons folded in 1938, Smith and Ferguson provided English broadcasts of Canadiens games. The great popularity of the radio show (and its announcer Foster Hewitt) across Canada made it an obvious choice for early Canadian network television programming.

CBC Radio aired Saturday night HNIC broadcasts through 1965, switching to Sunday Night NHL Hockey from 1965–76, after which the games moved exclusively to television coverage. In Toronto, CFRB (originally a CNR Radio affiliate) continued to simulcast Maple Leaf games for many years alongside CBC Radio's Toronto station CBL.

United States
During the 1930s, thanks to the powerful 50,000-watt transmitters of CBC Radio, the CBC's Hockey Night In Canada radio broadcasts became quite popular in much of the northern United States, especially in Boston, Chicago, Detroit, and New York City, the four U.S. cities that had NHL teams after 1924, but also in cities with minor-league or major collegiate hockey teams. Since most local radio coverage of U.S.-based NHL clubs was restricted to home games in those days, whenever Toronto hosted a U.S.-based team, many listeners in the home city of the visiting U.S.-based team would tune in. It has been claimed that during the late 1930s, Hockey Night In Canada was the most popular Saturday-night radio show during the fall and winter months in much of the northern United States.

National radio coverage of the NHL in the United States has been considerably spotty and/or sparse. Perhaps, the first example of national radio network coverage of the National Hockey League in the United States was in 1935–36, when Mutual broadcast some Chicago Black Hawks games. Mutual would follow this up by broadcasting Wednesday night New York Rangers home games in early 1956. Only some stations broadcast these games.

Network coverage would finally resume in 1981, when Enterprise Radio broadcast the Stanley Cup Finals. However, Enterprise Radio folded up shop shortly thereafter.

In 1989, the NHL signed a two-year contract (lasting through the 1990–91 season) with ABC Radio for the broadcast rights to the All-Star Game and Stanley Cup Finals. ABC Radio named Don Chevrier and Phil Esposito as their main commentating crew.

In 1992, national coverage of the All-Star Game and Stanley Cup Playoffs were broadcast on Star Broadcasting. One year later, the Global Sports Network obtained the national radio broadcasting rights to the All-Star Game and Stanley Cup Finals. Howie Rose and Mike Keenan were the commentators for Global's coverage.

Starting with 1993–94 NHL season, Westwood One's NHL Radio package debuted (covering the All-Star Game, Stanley Cup Finals, selected early round playoff action, and eventually, the Winter Classic).

XM Satellite Radio is the official satellite radio broadcaster of the NHL, as of July 1, 2007. Between September 2005 and June 2007, the NHL's broadcasting rights were shared with both XM and Sirius Satellite Radio and were broadcast on just Sirius before the NHL lockout. XM used to broadcast more than 80% of NHL games, including all the playoffs and finals. Starting with the 2007–08 season, XM broadcasts every game.

On December 22, 2015, the NHL announced that TuneIn would gain radio rights to the NHL. TuneIn would create an individual station for every NHL team to simulcast their home market broadcasts on. Additionally, TuneIn would create a replay channel for each team so fans could listen to the games archived. They would also create a 24/7 NHL Channel, and the NHL would imbed TuneIn's player onto the NHL.com website. All TuneIn NHL items would be made available to the entire public free. The first broadcasts for TuneIn began New Years Day, 2016.

On Tuesday, May 3, 2016, NBC Sports Radio was granted rights to broadcast and syndicate the 2016 Stanley Cup Finals. Kenny Albert provided the play-by-play while Joe Micheletti served as color commentator. This would be the first neutral national broadcast since the 2008 NHL Radio broadcast.

The Sports USA Radio Network took over rights to the NHL in February 2021 and broadcast the two outdoor games held in the 2020–21 NHL season and playoff games. It would later renew its rights until the 2024-25 season.

See also
List of current National Hockey League broadcasters
NHL Home Ice
Sabres Hockey Network
Boston Bruins Radio Network

References

External links
National Radio Broadcasts of the NHL History
The St. Louis Post-Dispatch's Dan Caesar says NHL fans do not have a national outlet to listen to the Stanley Cup Finals.

 
Radio
Mutual Broadcasting System
ABC Radio Sports
NBC Sports Radio